Blue Mound Golf & Country Club is a country club in the north central United States, located in Wauwatosa, Wisconsin, a suburb west of Milwaukee. The golf course was designed by Seth Raynor. 

The club hosted the PGA Championship in 1933, the Western Open in 1916, and the Women's Western Open in 1940, where Babe Zaharias defeated Mrs. Russell Mann in the 36-hole final of match play,  In the late 1990s, the course was restored by Tom Doak's Renaissance Design under the supervision of architect Bruce Hepner.

Blue Mound hosted the 2010 Western Junior, won by Patrick Rogers. It was also the second course for the first two rounds of the U.S. Amateur in 2011; the primary venue was Erin Hills, site of the U.S. Open in 2017.

References

External links

Golf Club Atlas – Blue Mound Golf & Country Club
Thegolfcourses.net

Golf clubs and courses in Wisconsin
Buildings and structures in Milwaukee County, Wisconsin
Sports venues completed in 1926
1926 establishments in Wisconsin
Sports in the Milwaukee metropolitan area